The 2013 Aircel Chennai Open was a 2013 ATP World Tour tennis tournament, played on outdoor hard courts. It was the 18th edition of the only ATP tournament taking place in India and took place at the SDAT Tennis Stadium in Chennai, India. It was held from 31 December to 6 January.

Singles main-draw entrants

Seeds 

1 Rankings as of 24 December 2012

Other entrants 
The following players received wildcards into the singles main draw:
  Tomáš Berdych
  Yuki Bhambri
  Somdev Devvarman

The following players received entry from the qualifying draw:
  Prakash Amritraj
  Ruben Bemelmans
  Rajeev Ram
  Cedrik-Marcel Stebe

Doubles main-draw entrants

Seeds

1 Rankings as of 24 December 2012

Other entrants
The following pairs received wildcards into the doubles main draw:
  Sriram Balaji /  Jeevan Nedunchezhian
  Sanam Singh /  Vishnu Vardhan

The following pair received entry as alternates:
  Somdev Devvarman /  Sergiy Stakhovsky

Withdrawals
Before the tournament
  Philipp Petzschner (knee injury)

Finals

Singles 

 Janko Tipsarević defeated  Roberto Bautista Agut, 3–6, 6–1, 6–3
 It was Tipsarevic's 4th career title.

Doubles 

 Benoît Paire /  Stanislas Wawrinka defeated  Andre Begemann /  Martin Emmrich, 6–2, 6–1

References

External links 
Official website

Aircel Chennai Open
Aircel Chennai Open
 
Chennai Open
Aircel Chennai Open
Aircel Chennai Open